Claudius (Tiberius Claudius Caesar Augustus Germanicus; 10 BC – 54 AD) was the fourth Roman Emperor, reigning from AD 41 to his death.

Claudius, a name of Latin origin meaning crippled, may also refer to:

People

Ancient world
Any member of the family of Claudii; see Claudia (gens)
Saint Claudius (disambiguation), the name of several Christian saints
Claudius Aelianus (c. 175 – c. 235), Roman author and teacher of rhetoric
Claudius Gothicus, also known as Marcus Aurelius Claudius or Claudius II, Roman Emperor from 268 to 270
Claudius Silvanus (died 355), Roman general and usurper

Middle Ages
Claudius, Duke of Lusitania, Hispano-Roman Catholic dux (duke) of Lusitania and general in the late sixth century
Claudius of Turin ( 810–827), bishop of Turin, teacher of iconoclasm
Claudius Clavus (1388–?), Danish geographer

Later
Gelawdewos of Ethiopia, known as Claudius in English, mid-16th-century Emperor of Ethiopia
Claudius Salmasius, Latin name of Claude Saumaise (1588–1653), French classical scholar
Hendrik Claudius, (c. 1655–1697), painter and apothecary
Claudius Smith (1736–1779), a notorious British Loyalist guerrilla leader in the American Revolution
Matthias Claudius (1740–1815), German poet famous for Death and the Maiden
Claudius Buchanan (1766–1815), Scottish theologian, ordained minister of the Church of England, and missionary
Claudius Crozet (1789–1864), French-American educator and civil engineer
Claudius B. Grant (1835–1921), American jurist
Eduard Claudius (1911–1976), German writer and diplomat
Claudius Dornier (1884–1969), German airplane builder and founder of Dornier GmbH
Hermann Claudius (1878–1980), German writer and poet, great-grandson of Matthias

Astronomy 
 7117 Claudius, asteroid

Other uses
King Claudius, Hamlet's uncle in Shakespeare's play Hamlet
Claudius, a genus of mud turtles
Claudius, a residential suburb of Centurion, South Africa that is closely associated with Laudium
 A typeface created by Rudolf Koch
Claudius, a 1703 Singspiel by Reinhard Keiser

See also
 Cladius (disambiguation)
 Clausius
 I, Claudius (disambiguation)
 List of Roman Emperors, as several Emperors had "Claudius" in their full names

Latin masculine given names